The year 1979 was the 198th year of the Rattanakosin Kingdom of Thailand. It was the 34th year in the reign of King Bhumibol Adulyadej (Rama IX), and is reckoned as year 2522 in the Buddhist Era.

Incumbents
King: Bhumibol Adulyadej 
Crown Prince: Vajiralongkorn
Prime Minister: Kriangsak Chamanan
Supreme Patriarch: Ariyavangsagatayana VII

 
Years of the 20th century in Thailand
Thailand
Thailand
1970s in Thailand